Magno Aparecido de Andrade (born 28 June 1987 in Lavras), commonly known as Magal, is a Brazilian footballer who plays as a left back.

Career
Magal plays both left back and right back. He began in Guarani-MG, followed by Uberlândia, Villa Nova (MG) and Democrata-GV, all of Minas Gerais, state where born. In 2010, he arrived to ASA of Alagoas, and, in the following year, he went to Americana, where he made 49 matches and one goal.

He arrived in Flamengo in the season of 2012. In an interview with Radio Brasil, a religious broadcaster, the first reinforcement of Flamengo to the season 2012, slipped in the vocabulary when asked about what changes in your life. Called attention of the technical commission red-black for the fact of be an athlete disciplined and have led only one yellow-card in the dispute of the Serie B. He made 35 games in championship. In his first press conference as a football player of Flamengo, the left back, he declared himself a fan of Thierry Henry, including revealed that the name of his son, Therry Daniel, was in honor of the French striker. Premiered in victory of 4 to 0 over the Bonsucesso, in match valid for the 2012 Campeonato Carioca.

Career statistics
(Correct )

according to combined sources on the Flamengo official website and Flaestatística.

References

External links
Ascenso MX profile

1987 births
Living people
Brazilian footballers
Brazilian expatriate footballers
Sportspeople from Minas Gerais
Association football defenders
Campeonato Brasileiro Série A players
Campeonato Brasileiro Série B players
Uberlândia Esporte Clube players
Villa Nova Atlético Clube players
Esporte Clube Democrata players
Agremiação Sportiva Arapiraquense players
Guaratinguetá Futebol players
CR Flamengo footballers
Esporte Clube Bahia players
Associação Portuguesa de Desportos players
Associação Atlética Ponte Preta players
Clube Atlético Bragantino players
São Bernardo Futebol Clube players
FC Juárez footballers
Tupynambás Futebol Clube players
Brazilian expatriate sportspeople in Mexico
Expatriate footballers in Mexico